Gökçekanat is a village in the Bingöl District, Bingöl Province, Turkey. The village is populated by Kurds of the Bekiran tribe and had a population of 338 in 2021.

The hamlet of Bulutlu is attached to the village.

References 

Villages in Bingöl District
Kurdish settlements in Bingöl Province